The hop stunt viroid (abbreviated HSVd) is a viroid species that infects the common hop plant, citrus plants and grapevines, among others. It is a member of the Pospiviroidae family and the Hostuviroid genus.
There are quite a few different sub-species of the hop stunt viroid.

Genome 
The hop stunt viroid has a single stranded RNA genome; the genome is 297 nucleotides long.

Hop stunt viroids
Australian grapevine viroid
Citrus gummy bark viroid
Grapevine yellow speckle viroid 1
Grapevine yellow speckle viroid 2
Dapple peach fruit disease viroid
Citrus chachexia viroid
Cucumber pale fruit viroid
Dapple plum and peach fruit disease viroid

References

Viroids
Hop diseases